Asketum Branch is a  long 1st order tributary to Tyndall Branch, in Sussex County, Delaware.

Course
Asketum Branch rises on the Shoal Branch divide about 0.25 miles southeast of Jones Crossroads in Sussex County, Delaware.  Asketum Branch then flows northwest to meet Tyndall Branch about 0.5 miles north of Hardscrabble.

Watershed
Asketum Branch drains  of area, receives about 45.1 in/year of precipitation, has a topographic wetness index of 665.35 and is about 10.35% forested.

See also
List of rivers of Delaware

References 

Rivers of Delaware
Tributaries of the Nanticoke River